Regularized least squares (RLS) is a family of methods for solving the least-squares problem while using regularization to further constrain the resulting solution.

RLS is used for two main reasons. The first comes up when the number of variables in the linear system exceeds the number of observations. In such settings, the ordinary least-squares problem is ill-posed and is therefore impossible to fit because the associated optimization problem has infinitely many solutions. RLS allows the introduction of further constraints that uniquely determine the solution.

The second reason for using RLS arises when the learned model suffers from poor generalization. RLS can be used in such cases to improve the generalizability of the model by constraining it at training time. This constraint can either force the solution to be "sparse" in some way or to reflect other prior knowledge about the problem such as information about correlations between features. A Bayesian understanding of this can be reached by showing that RLS methods are often equivalent to priors on the solution to the least-squares problem.

General formulation 

Consider a learning setting given by a probabilistic space , . Let  be a loss function. Define  as the space of the functions such that expected risk: 

is well defined. 
The main goal is to minimize the expected risk:

Since the problem cannot be solved exactly there is a need to specify how to measure the quality of a solution. A good learning algorithm should provide an estimator with a small risk.

As the joint distribution   is typically unknown, the empirical risk is taken. For regularized least squares the square loss function is introduced:

Thus, it should somehow constrain or penalize the complexity of the function . In RLS, this is accomplished by choosing functions from a reproducing kernel Hilbert space (RKHS) , and adding a regularization term to the objective function, proportional to the norm of the function in :

Kernel formulation

Definition of RKHS 
A RKHS can be defined by a symmetric positive-definite kernel function  with the reproducing property:

where . The RKHS for a kernel  consists of the completion of the space of functions spanned by : , where all  are real numbers. Some commonly used kernels include the linear kernel, inducing the space of linear functions:

 

the polynomial kernel, inducing the space of polynomial functions of order :

 

and the Gaussian kernel:

 

Note that for an arbitrary loss function , this approach defines a general class of algorithms named Tikhonov regularization. For instance, using the hinge loss leads to the support vector machine algorithm, and using the epsilon-insensitive loss leads to support vector regression.

Arbitrary kernel
The representer theorem guarantees that the solution can be written as:

The minimization problem can be expressed as:

For such a function,

The following minimization problem can be obtained:
.

As the sum of convex functions is convex, the solution is unique and its minimum can be found by setting the gradient w.r.t  to :

where

Complexity 

Prediction 
The prediction at a new test point  is:

Linear kernel 
For convenience a vector notation is introduced. Let  be an  matrix, where the rows are input vectors, and  a  vector where the entries are corresponding outputs. The learning function can be written as:

Here we define . The objective function can be rewritten as:

The first term is the objective function from ordinary least squares (OLS) regression, corresponding to the residual sum of squares. The second term is a regularization term, not present in OLS, which penalizes large  values.
As a smooth finite dimensional problem is considered and it is possible to apply standard calculus tools.

 

 

This solution closely resembles that of standard linear regression, with an extra term . The term  therefore leads to a biased solution; however, it also tends to reduce variance. Therefore, manipulating  corresponds to trading-off bias and variance. For problems with high-variance  estimates, such as cases with relatively small  or with correlated regressors, the optimal prediction accuracy may be obtained by using a nonzero , and thus introducing some bias to reduce variance. Furthermore, it is not uncommon in machine learning to have cases where , in which case  is rank-deficient, and a nonzero  is necessary to compute .

Complexity 
The parameter 
controls the invertibility of the matrix .
Several methods can be used to solve the above linear system,
Cholesky decomposition being probably the method of choice, since the matrix  is symmetric and positive definite.
 for testing.

Feature maps and Mercer's theorem
In this section it will be shown how to extend RLS to any kind of reproducing kernel K. Instead of linear kernel a feature map is considered
 for some Hilbert space , called the feature space.

It means that for a given training set . Thus, the objective function can be written as

This approach is known as the kernel trick. This technique can significantly simplify the computational operations. If  is high dimensional, computing   may be rather intensive.  If the explicit form of the kernel function is known, we just need to compute and store the  kernel matrix .

This  follows from Mercer's theorem, which states that a continuous, symmetric, positive definite kernel function can be expressed as

 

If feature maps  is defined  with components , it follows that . This demonstrates that any kernel can be associated with a feature map, and that RLS generally consists of linear RLS performed in some possibly higher-dimensional feature space. While Mercer's theorem shows how one feature map that can be associated with a kernel, in fact multiple feature maps can be associated with a given reproducing kernel. For instance, the map  satisfies the property  for an arbitrary reproducing kernel.

Bayesian interpretation

Least squares can be viewed as a likelihood maximization under an assumption of normally distributed residuals. This is because the exponent of the Gaussian distribution is quadratic in the data, and so is the least-squares objective function. For instance, Tikhonov regularization corresponds to a normally distributed prior on  that is centered at 0. Then observe that a normal prior on  centered at 0 has a log-probability of the form
 
Thus, minimizing the logarithm of the likelihood times the prior is equivalent to minimizing the sum of the OLS loss function and the ridge regression regularization term.

This gives a more intuitive interpretation for why Tikhonov regularization leads to a unique solution to the least-squares problem: there are infinitely many vectors  satisfying the constraints obtained from the data, but since we come to the problem with a prior belief that  is normally distributed around the origin, we will end up choosing a solution with this constraint in mind.

Other regularization methods correspond to different priors. See the list below for more details.

Specific examples

Ridge regression (or Tikhonov regularization)

One particularly common choice for the penalty function   is the squared  norm, i.e.,
 

The most common names for this are called Tikhonov regularization and ridge regression. 
It admits a closed-form solution for :
 
The name ridge regression alludes to the fact that the  term adds positive entries along the diagonal "ridge" of the sample covariance matrix .

When , i.e., in the case of ordinary least squares, the condition that  causes the sample covariance matrix  to not have full rank and so it cannot be inverted to yield a unique solution. This is why there can be an infinitude of solutions to the ordinary least squares problem when . In other words, it becomes invertible, and the solution becomes unique.

Compared to ordinary least squares, ridge regression is not unbiased. It accepts bias to reduce variance and the mean square error.

Lasso regression

The least absolute selection and shrinkage (LASSO) method is another popular choice. In lasso regression, the lasso penalty function  is the  norm, i.e.
 

Note that the lasso penalty function is convex but not strictly convex. 
Unlike Tikhonov regularization, this scheme does not have a convenient closed-form solution: instead, the solution is typically found using quadratic programming or more general convex optimization methods, as well as by specific algorithms such as the least-angle regression algorithm.

Which of these regimes is more relevant depends on the specific data set at hand.

Besides feature selection described above, LASSO has some limitations. Ridge regression provides better accuracy in the case  for highly correlated variables. In another case, LASSO selects at most  variables. Moreover, LASSO tends to select some arbitrary variables from group of highly correlated samples, so there is no grouping effect.

ℓ0 Penalization

This regularization function, while attractive for the sparsity that it guarantees, is very difficult to solve because doing so requires optimization of a function that is not even weakly convex. Lasso regression is the minimal possible relaxation of  penalization that yields a weakly convex optimization problem.

Elastic net

For any non-negative  and  the objective has the following form:

Let , then the solution of the minimization problem is described as:

Consider    as an Elastic Net penalty function.

When , elastic net becomes ridge regression, whereas  it becomes Lasso.  Elastic Net penalty function doesn't have the first derivative at 0 and it is strictly convex 
 taking the properties both lasso regression and ridge regression.

One of the main properties of the Elastic Net is that it can select groups of correlated variables.
, where .

In the case of negatively correlated samples  the samples  can be taken. To summarize, for highly correlated variables the weight vectors tend to be equal up to a sign in the case of negative correlated variables.

Partial list of RLS methods
The following is a list of possible choices of the regularization function , along with the name for each one, the corresponding prior if there is a simple one, and ways for computing the solution to the resulting optimization problem.

See also
 Least squares
 Regularization in mathematics.
 Generalization error, one of the reasons regularization is used.
 Tikhonov regularization
 Lasso regression
 Elastic net regularization
 :Least-angle regression

References

External links 
 http://www.stanford.edu/~hastie/TALKS/enet_talk.pdf Regularization and Variable Selection via the Elastic Net (presentation)
Regularized Least Squares and Support Vector Machines (presentation)
 Regularized Least Squares(presentation)

Least squares
Linear algebra
Inverse problems